Chemnitzer Fußballclub e.V. is a German association football club based in Chemnitz, Saxony. The club competes in Regionalliga Nordost, the fourth tier of German football.

The roots of the club go back to its establishment as Chemnitzer BC 1933, following the financial collapse of former Chemnitzer BC 1899.

History

The club was initially formed by students from Mittweida as Chemnitzer SC Britannia on 2 December 1899.

On 28 January 1900, Chemnitzer SC Britannia was a founding member of the German Football Association (DFB) in Leipzig. During April the same year, the club changed its name to Chemnitzer BC 1899.

On 8 August 1903, the club became a founding member of the Verband Chemnitzer Fußball-Vereine (VCFV). This local federation was included into the Verband Mitteldeutscher Fußball-Vereine (VMBV), the great regional federation of Central Germany, two years later.

Until 1933, Chemnitzer BC were a strong side of the VMBV leagues. They took part in the WMBV's final round fifteen times, reaching the final once in 1927. Despite a 0–4 defeat against VfB Leipzig, Chemnitz qualified for the 1927 German football championship as vice-champions, where they lost in the first round against eventual champions 1. FC Nürnberg, 1–5.

In 1933, Chemnitzer BC 1899 came into financial difficulties. Despite a merger with local rivals SC Sachsen 1909 Chemnitz, bankruptcy and liquidation could not be avoided. The side was then immediately re-formed under the name Chemnitzer BC 1933, which assumed the history of the old club. CBC 1933 were part of the Gauliga Saxony until the end of World War II.

FC Karl-Marx-Stadt

In the aftermath of the conflict, most organizations in Germany, including sports and football clubs, were dissolved by the Allied occupation authorities. The side was re-established in 1945 as SG Chemnitz Nord before, as it was common in East German football at the time, undergoing a number of name changes, from BSG Fewa Chemnitz in 1948 to BSG Chemie Chemnitz in 1951. Upon the renaming of the city of Chemnitz to Karl-Marx-Stadt in 1953, the club followed suit and assumed the new city name as well. In 1956, the football club was attached to the larger centralized sports club SC Motor Karl-Marx-Stadt, which was in turn renamed SC Karl-Marx-Stadt in 1963. The football department was then once again separated from the sports club as FC Karl-Marx-Stadt in 1966, under a government plan to establish a number of football clubs as centres throughout the country intended to identify and develop talent in support of a strong national side. When the city re-claimed its original name in 1991, the team followed suit to become Chemnitzer FC.

After joining the DDR-Oberliga for the 1962–63 season, the club generally earned uninspiring results, most often finishing in the lower half of the league table. They managed a surprising East German championship win at the end of the 1966–67 season, and were runners-up in the East German Cup (FDGB Cup) in 1969, 1983 and 1989. The club enjoyed its best international turn in 1989, advancing through two preliminary rounds to the Round of 16 of the 1989–90 UEFA Cup before being knocked out against Juventus. In the same season the team finished as runners-up in the East German championship, second to Dynamo Dresden on goal differential.

After German reunification in 1990, Chemnitzer FC qualified for the 2. Bundesliga at the end of the 1990–91 NOFV-Oberliga. Beginning with the 1991–92 season, Chemnitz spent five years in the second tier of German football until being relegated to the then third-tier Regionalliga in 1996, and also advanced to the semi-final of the 1992–93 DFB-Pokal during this time. Since then, the importance of the club has faded. The following four years were evenly split between the Regionalliga and the 2. Bundesliga before eventually being relegated back to the Regionalliga (III) in 2001 and subsequently to the NOFV-Oberliga Süd (IV) in 2006. The last couple of years, however, saw the club slowly rising through the German league system once again with promotions to the now fourth-tier Regionalliga in 2008 and the 3. Liga in 2011. In 2018, the club was relegated to the fourth league.

The club was at the centre of a controversy after the club, some of its players and fans paid tribute to Thomas Haller, a prominent far-right activist before kick-off against VSG Altglienicke at home on 9 March 2019. Haller, who provided security for the club and co-founded HooNaRa (Hooligans-Nazis-Racists) in the 1990s received a minute's silence, while a picture of Haller was displayed on a large screen at the stadium. Chemnitzer FC forward Daniel Frahn held up a shirt honouring Haller and other "local hooligans". The club's chief executive Thomas Uhlig resigned as a result of the controversy, and Sparkasse Chemnitz said it will no longer sponsor the club after the end of this season.

In August 2019, the club sacked its captain, Daniel Frahn, after he was accused of "openly displaying" his sympathy for neo-Nazi groups among the club's supporters.

Honours

League
 DDR-Oberliga
 Champions: 1967
 Runners-up: 1990
 Central German football championship
 Runners-up: 1922, 1927, 1929
 Regionalliga Nord (Tier 4)
 Champions: 2011
 Regionalliga Nordost (Tier 3 & 4)
 Champions: 1999, 2019

Cup
 FDGB-Pokal
 Runners-up: 1969, 1983, 1989
 DFB-Pokal
 Semi-finalist: 1993
 Fuwo-Pokal (de)
 Winners: 1972

Regional
 Gauliga Sachsen
 Champions: 1935, 1936
 Saxony Cup (Tiers 3–7)
 Winners (12): 1997, 1998, 2006, 2008, 2010, 2012, 2014, 2015, 2017, 2019, 2020, 2022

Players

Current squad

Coaches
 Karl Haueisen – 1952 to 1953
 Heinz Hartmann – 1953 to 1955
 Rolf Kukowitsch – 1955
 Walter Fritzsch – 1956–1957
 Fritz Wittenbecher – February 1958 to May 1958
 Hans Höfer – May 1958 to December 1960
 Siegfried Seifert – September 1960 to February 1961
 Heinz Werner – 1 March 1961 to 1963
 Horst Scherbaum – 1963 to 1968
 Bringfried Müller – 1968 to 1970
 Heinz Weber – 1970 to 30 June 1971
 Gerhard Hofmann – 1 July 1971 to December 1974
 Dieter Erler – December 1974 to 1976
 Herbert Naumann – 1976 to 31 March 1976
 Manfred Kupferschmied – 1 April 1976 to 1980
 Manfred Lienemann – 1981 to 1985
 Heinz Werner – 1985 to 1988
 Hans Meyer – 1988 to 30. June 1993
 Reinhard Häfner – 1 July 1993 to 15 May 1996
 Christoph Franke – 15 May 1996 to 7 September 2000
 Josip Kuze – 7 September 2000 to 29 November 2000
 Manfred Lienemann – 29 November 2000 to 10 December 2000
 Dirk Karkuth – 11 December 2000 to 24 August 2001
 Matthias Schulz – 24 August 2001 to 31 October 2002
 Dirk Barsikow – 31 October 2002 to 11 November 2002
 Joachim Müller – 11 November 2002 to 18 June 2003
 Frank Rohde – 18 June 2003 to 18 September 2004
 Dirk Barsikow – 18 September 2004 to 4 March 2005
 Dietmar Demuth – 5 March 2005 to 15 December 2005
 Joachim Müller – 15. December 2005 to 7 April 2007
 Tino Vogel – 10 April 2007 – 21 April 2008
 Christoph Franke – 21 April 2008 to 30 June 2008
 Gerd Schädlich – 1 July 2008 to 6 October 2013
 Karsten Heine – 9 October 2013 to 2 March 2016
 Sven Köhler – 2 March 2016 to 30 June 2017
 Horst Steffen – 1 July 2017 to 2 January 2018
 Sreto Ristić – 2 January 2018 to 6 January 2018
 David Bergner – 6 January 2018 to 4 September 2019
 Sreto Ristić – 4 September 2019 to 22 September 2019
 Patrick Glöckner – 22 September 2019 to

Recent seasons
The recent season-by-season performance of the club:

 With the introduction of the Regionalligas in 1994 and the 3. Liga in 2008 as the new third tier, below the 2. Bundesliga, all leagues below dropped one tier.

Key

Reserve team
The club's reserve team, Chemnitzer FC II, most recently played in the tier five NOFV-Oberliga Süd. It first played at this level from 1993 to 1998 with a runners-up finish in 1996 as its best result. After relegation and an absence of thirteen seasons the team returned to the Oberliga in 2010. The club announced that it would withdraw its reserve team at the end of the 2014–15 season.

The team also made a losing appearance in the 1996 Saxony Cup final.

Stadium
Chemnitzer FC plays in the club-owned Stadion an der Gellertstraße which has a capacity of 16,061 spectators (~540 seats). Until 1990 the facility was officially known as "Dr. Kurt-Fischer-Stadion", or locally as the "Fischerwiese". During its 2. Bundesliga seasons the club also made use of the larger Chemnitzer Sportforum, which has a capacity of over 19,000.

References

External links

The Abseits Guide to German Soccer
CFC Fanpage
CFC Fans

 
Football clubs in Germany
Football clubs in East Germany
Football clubs in Saxony
Association football clubs established in 1966
1966 establishments in East Germany
Sport in Chemnitz
2. Bundesliga clubs
3. Liga clubs